Muppalla is a village in Ponnaluru mandal, Prakasam district in Indian state of Andhra Pradesh.

Demographics 
As per 2011 India census Total population of Muppalla is 1705 .Muppalla caste overview is 40%  OC (Reddy), 30%  BC and OBC and remaining 30% is SC & ST, In that Males are 841 and Females are 861 living in 433 Houses. Total area of Muppalla is 696 hectares. Muppalla Village having 62.03% Literacy, In that Male 73.85% and Female 50.69%.

Education
The primary and secondary schools education is imparted by government such as Z.P.H.S Muppalla and M.P.P School, under the School Education Department of the state. The medium of instruction followed by different schools are English, Telugu. There are two engineering colleges in Kandukur which is nearer to Muppalla village.

Assembly constituency
Muppalla is under Kondapi assembly constituency in Praksam District, Andhra Pradesh. There were 1,600 registered voters in Muppalla village for the 2014 elections.
Muppalla is part of "Ongole" parliament constituency.

Culture
Muppalla Village shows south Indian culture in a Pure form of Andhra traditional styles and also Grama Devathalu[village goddesses] festivals for Gangamma Thalli and Durga devi etc. based on Hindu religion.

References

Villages in Prakasam district